Erwin Piechowiak (15 November 1936 – 31 March 2021) was a German professional footballer who played as a defender.

Career
Born in Hamburg, Piechowiak played for Hamburger SV and SC Sperber. With HSV he won the 1960 German football championship.

References

1936 births
2021 deaths
German footballers
Hamburger SV players
Oberliga (football) players
Bundesliga players
Association football defenders
Footballers from Hamburg